The 1993 International League season took place from April to September 1993.

The Charlotte Knights defeated the Rochester Red Wings to win the league championship.

Team changes
With the 1993 Major League Baseball expansion taking place, two new expansion teams had to be placed in the IL. The Ottawa Lynx and the Charlotte Knights were added into the East and the West Divisions, respectively. The Lynx would serve as the Triple-A affiliate of the Montreal Expos, while the Knights would serve as the Triple-A affiliate of the Cleveland Indians.

Attendance
Charlotte Knights - 429,132
Columbus Clippers - 580,570
Norfolk Tides - 542,040
Ottawa Lynx - 693,043
Pawtucket Red Sox - 466,428
Richmond Braves - 540,489
Rochester Red Wings - 381,061
Scranton/Wilkes-Barre Red Barons - 542,558
Syracuse Chiefs - 262,760
Toledo Mud Hens - 285,155

Standings

Stats

Batting leaders

Pitching leaders

Regular season

Opening Day

All-Star game
The 1993 Triple-A All-Star Game was held at Albuquerque Sports Stadium in Albuquerque, New Mexico, home of the Albuquerque Dukes of the Pacific Coast League. The All stars representing the National League affiliates won 14-3. Richmond Braves first baseman Ryan Klesko was given the top award for the International League.

Playoffs

Division Series
The Rochester Red Wings won the East Division Series over the Ottawa Lynx, 3 games to 2.

The Charlotte Knights won the West Division Series over the Richmond Braves, 3 games to 1.

Championship series 
The Charlotte Knights won the Governors' Cup Finals over the Rochester Red Wings, 3 games to 2.

References

External links
International League official website 

 
International League seasons